Georgia's 111th House District elects one member of the Georgia House of Representatives. 
Its current representative is Democrat El-Mahdi Holly.

Elected representatives

References

Georgia House of Representatives districts
Henry County, Georgia